Broadmeadows is a minor western suburb of Wellington, New Zealand. It is located to the north of Khandallah and south of Johnsonville. Despite its name suggesting that the area was once flat open fields, the suburb was created on steeply sloping hills and features the highest streets within Wellington City with a number of houses located more than 300m above sea level. Broadmeadows has a population of 1,635.

Facilities

Parks and reserves
The Skyline Walkway provides access to Mount Kaukau.

Politics

Local government

In local government Broadmeadows forms part of the Onslow-Western Ward. The ward is represented by Diane Calvert, Simon Woolf and Rebecca Matthews as of 2020.

National government
In national government Broadmeadows is part of the  general electorate represented by Greg O'Connor of the New Zealand Labour Party since 2017. Broadmeadows is in the Te Tai Tonga Māori electorate represented by Rino Tirikatene (Labour) since 2011.

Demographics 

Broadmeadows had a population of 1,629 at the 2018 New Zealand census, an increase of 93 people (6.1%) since the 2013 census, and an increase of 144 people (9.7%) since the 2006 census. There were 591 households. There were 819 males and 813 females, giving a sex ratio of 1.01 males per female. The median age was 37.5 years (compared with 37.4 years nationally), with 306 people (18.8%) aged under 15 years, 303 (18.6%) aged 15 to 29, 822 (50.5%) aged 30 to 64, and 198 (12.2%) aged 65 or older.

Ethnicities were 65.4% European/Pākehā, 7.6% Māori, 3.3% Pacific peoples, 30.8% Asian, and 3.9% other ethnicities (totals add to more than 100% since people could identify with multiple ethnicities).

The proportion of people born overseas was 38.5%, compared with 27.1% nationally.

Although some people objected to giving their religion, 50.3% had no religion, 32.6% were Christian, 5.0% were Hindu, 2.4% were Muslim, 2.4% were Buddhist and 3.3% had other religions.

Of those at least 15 years old, 564 (42.6%) people had a bachelor or higher degree, and 96 (7.3%) people had no formal qualifications. The median income was $47,600, compared with $31,800 nationally. The employment status of those at least 15 was that 768 (58.0%) people were employed full-time, 171 (12.9%) were part-time, and 48 (3.6%) were unemployed.

Transport
Broadmeadows is connected to central Wellington by Metlink buses. Bus 24 connect Johnsonville and Broadmeadows to the CBD until Miramar Heights.

References

Suburbs of Wellington City